The Great Northern S-1 was a class of 6 4-8-4 Northern type steam locomotives built by the Baldwin Locomotive Works in 1929 and operated by the Great Northern Railway until the late 1950s. They were initially put in passenger service but eventually saw service pulling freight.

History

Design
Initially intended for passenger pulling, the S-1s eventually found their way into pulling freight trains. The S-1 is capable of pulling 18 conventional steel passenger cars westbound and 13 cars eastbound, and 14 cars if the weather is favorable. Should passenger trains exceed such a number of cars eastbound, helper service is added between Walton and Summit. With the help of a pusher, they can pull up to 6,000 tons eastbound. Only one S-1 was fitted with a vestibule cab, No. 2552. Despite their overall success, they had a reputation for being hard on the rails. They were also fitted with roller bearings in the 1940s.

Revenue service
When delivered, they were assigned for passenger service over the Divide between Havre and Whitefish, Montana, then in 1931, they were tested to pull freight between Whitefish, Montana and Hillyard, Washington. The test was a success and the S-1s were reassigned to pull freight trains, leaving the passenger runs mainly to the later S-2 Class of 1930. The S-1 continued pulling freight until dieselization. Retirement started on April 19, 1956 and by April 1958, all of the S-1s have been retired.

Disposition
No S-1 has survived into preservation today, the first S-1 was sold for scrap on April 19, 1956 and by 1963, all of the S-1s have been scrapped.

Roster

See also
Great Northern S-2

References

Great Northern Railway (U.S.)
4-8-4 locomotives
Baldwin locomotives
Railway locomotives introduced in 1929
S-1
Steam locomotives of the United States
Standard gauge locomotives of the United States
Scrapped locomotives
Passenger locomotives